The Auctores octo morales (Eight Moral Authors) was a collection of Latin textbooks, of an elementary standard, that was used for pedagogy in the Middle Ages in Europe. It was printed in many editions, from the end of the fifteenth century. At that time it became standardised as:

Distichs of Cato
Eclogue of Theodulus
Facetus: Liber Faceti docens mores iuvenum (Also believed to be by Cato of the Distichs)De contemptu mundiLiber FloretusMatthew of Vendôme, TobiasAlan of Lille, Doctrinale altum parabolarum''
Aesop, version attributed to Gualterus Anglicus (online text).

Notes

External links
Catalogue entry for Auctores Octo cum Commentario of 1494
Auctores Octo Morales full book on Google Books 

Medieval European education
Latin textbooks
15th-century Latin books